The , also sometimes read as  or , is an early Japanese chronicle of myths, legends, hymns, genealogies, oral traditions, and semi-historical accounts down to 641 concerning the origin of the Japanese archipelago, the , and the Japanese imperial line. It is claimed in its preface to have been composed by Ō no Yasumaro at the request of Empress Genmei in the early 8th century (711–712), and thus is usually considered to be the oldest extant literary work in Japan.

Later, they were incorporated into Shinto practices such as the  purification ritual.

Composition 

It is believed that the compilation of various genealogical and anecdotal histories of the imperial (Yamato) court and prominent clans began during the reigns of Emperors Keitai and Kinmei in the 6th century, with the first concerted effort at historical compilation of which we have record being the one made in 620 under the auspices of Prince Shotoku and Soga no Umako. According to the Nihon Shoki, the documents compiled under their initiative were the Tennōki (also Sumera-mikoto no fumi) or the "Record of the Emperors", the Kokki (also Kunitsufumi) or the "National Record", and other "fundamental records" (hongi or mototsufumi) pertaining to influential clans and free subjects. Out of these texts, only the Kokki survived the burning of Soga no Emishi's estate (where these documents were kept) during the Isshi incident of 645, and was itself apparently lost soon after.

The Kojiki preface indicates that leading families also kept their own historical and genealogical records; indeed, one of the reasons it gives for the compilation of the Kojiki is the correction of errors that had supposedly crept into these documents. According to the preface, Emperor Tenmu (reigned 673–686) ordered the review and emendation of clan documents and commissioned a certain court attendant (toneri) of exceptional memory named Hieda no Are to memorize records and oral traditions concerning the imperial lineage. Beyond this memorization, nothing occurred until the reign of Empress Genmei (reigned 707–715), who on the 18th of the 9th month of 711 (Wadō 4) ordered the courtier Ō no Yasumaro to record what had been learned by Hieda no Are. He finished and presented his work to Empress Genmei on the 28th of the 1st month of 712 (Wadō 5).

Purpose 

The Kojiki is a collation of different traditions woven into a single "official" mythology, made in an attempt to justify the rule of the imperial Yamato polity and at the same time to subsume different interest groups under its wing by giving them a place and an interest in the national genealogy-mythology. Apart from furthering the imperial agenda, an increased interest in the nation's origins in reaction to the influx of foreign culture and the need for an authoritative genealogical account by which to consider the claims of noble families and to reorganize them into a new system of ranks and titles are also possible factors for its compilation.

The Kojiki narrative establishes the Yamato line's right to rule via myth and legend, portraying it as the progeny of heavenly deities and the rightful heir to the land of Japan. A good part of the latter portion of the text is spent recounting various genealogies which served not only to give the imperial family an air of antiquity (which may not necessarily reflect historical reality), but also served to tie, whether true or not, many existing clans' genealogies to their own. Regardless of the work's original intent, it finalized and possibly even formulated the framework by which Japanese history was examined in terms of the reign of emperors.

In contrast to the Nihon Shoki (compiled 720), the first of six histories commissioned by the imperial court, which was modeled on Chinese dynastic histories and was intended to be a national chronicle that could be shown with pride to foreign envoys, the Kojiki is inward looking, concerned mainly with the ruling family and prominent clans, and is apparently intended for internal consumption. Whereas the Nihon Shoki uses a variety of source documents (including Chinese texts), the Kojiki is apparently based on sources handed down within the court.

Transmission and study 

Whereas the Nihon Shoki, owing to its status as one of the six imperial histories, was widely read and studied during the Heian period (794–1185), the Kojiki was mostly treated as an ancillary text. Indeed, a work known as the Sendai Kuji Hongi (also known as the Kujiki), claimed to have been authored by Prince Shōtoku and Soga no Umako, was considered to be earlier and more reliable than the Kojiki. (Modern scholarly consensus holds the Kuji Hongi to be a Heian period forgery based on both the Kojiki and the Shoki, although certain portions may indeed preserve genuine early traditions and sources.) By the Kamakura period (1185–1333), the work languished in obscurity such that very few people had access to the text, particularly that of the middle (second) volume. It is due to this neglect that the Kojiki is available only in comparatively late manuscripts, the earliest of which dates to the late 14th century.

It was with the advent of printing in the early modern period that the Kojiki first reached a wide audience. The earliest printed edition of the text was the Kan'ei Kojiki, published in Kyoto in 1644 (Kan'ei 21). A second edition, the Gōtō Kojiki ("Kojiki with Marginal Notes") was printed by Deguchi (Watarai) Nobuyoshi, a priest at Ise Shrine, in 1687 (Jōkyō 4).

The birth of nativist studies (kokugaku) and nationalist sentiment during the Edo period saw a reappraisal of the Kojiki. Kokugaku scholars saw Japan's earliest writings as the repository of a uniquely superior Japanese identity that could be revived by recovering the ancient language they were written in; the Kojiki, by virtue of its antiquity, gained the status of a sacred text. The Kojiki came to be highly regarded that scholars such as Kada no Azumamaro and Kamo no Mabuchi – himself a student of Azumamaro – produced annotated versions of it.

The Kojiki received its most serious study and exposition in the hands of Motoori Norinaga, who obtained a copy of the Kan'ei printed edition in 1754. After meeting Mabuchi in 1763, Norinaga began to devote his efforts to an in-depth scholarly study of the text. A monumental 44-volume study of the Kojiki called , composed over a 34-year period (1764–1798), was the fruit of his labor. With Norinaga, the Kojiki assumed an importance equal to the Nihon Shoki; in fact, in his view the Kojiki was a more trustworthy source for ancient Japanese traditions than was the Shoki precisely because it was free of "Chinese mentality". He viewed the Kojiki as a true account of actual events that when read correctly, could reveal Japan in its pristine, ideal state as a community where the kami, the emperor and the people lived in harmony. Norinaga's work was carried on in different directions by his disciple Hirata Atsutane and his rivals Fujitani Mitsue (1781–1849) and Tachibana Moribe (1768–1823), who each produced commentaries and treatises on the text.

The Kojiki became once more the object of scholarly focus and discussion in the Meiji period with the introduction of Western academic disciplines such as philology and comparative mythology. The importance of the text as a work of literary value was recognized, and scholars realized that its accounts were comparable in many ways to ancient Greek and Roman myths. At the same time, however, the Kojiki and Nihon Shoki achieved a sort of scriptural status under State Shintō, which viewed the stories contained therein as orthodox national history. Official ideology upheld as unquestionable fact the belief in the emperor's divinity and the idea of Japan as a racially superior "national body" (kokutai), with scholars who questioned their veracity facing the threat of censorship, forced resignation, or even trial in court.

Until the Meiji era, the text's sacred nature was not known to have been questioned. However, the Kojiki was still widely seen as inferior to the Nihon Shoki until Motoori Norinaga wrote the Kojiki-den. In 1913, Tsuda Sōkichi argued in a study that the Kojiki, particularly in its earlier sections, was neither history nor myth but a document created to legitimize the rule of the imperial line. While his conclusions led to considerable controversy, his influence remains in subsequent studies of the text (particularly in post-World War II scholarship), which amounts largely to development and correction of the line of thought originally proposed by him. In reaction to Tsuda, Watsuji Tetsurō (1920) argued for a literary appreciation of the Kojiki, claiming that this gave it inner coherence. Kurano Kenji (1927) took it a step further, proposing that the Kojiki may best be compared with Western epic literature and regarded as a national epic like Beowulf is in the English-speaking world. During the 1920s and 30s, linguist Hashimoto Shinkichi studied the phonology of the Old Japanese language, and his conclusions were applied by scholars to the study of the text.

The Kojiki continued to attract the attention of academics and other specialists in the post-war period, which saw the appearance of numerous editions, translations and commentaries on the text by authors such as Kurano Kenji, Takeda Yūkichi, Saigō Nobutsuna, and Kōnoshi Takamitsu.

Manuscripts
There are two major branches of Kojiki manuscripts: Ise and Urabe. The extant Urabe branch consists of 36 existing manuscripts all based on the 1522 copies by Urabe Kanenaga. The Ise branch may be subdivided into the  manuscript of 1371–1372 and the  manuscripts. The Dōka sub-branch consists of:
 the  manuscript of 1381; only the first half of the first volume remains
 the  manuscript of 1424; only the first volume remains, and there are many defects
 the  manuscript of 1426; one volume

The Shinpukuji-bon manuscript (1371–1372) is the oldest existing manuscript. While divided into the Ise branch, it is actually a mixture of the two branches. The monk Ken'yu based his copy on Ōnakatomi Sadayo's copy. In 1266, Sadayo copied volumes one and three but did not have access to the second volume. Finally, in 1282, he obtained access to the second volume through a Urabe-branch manuscript that he used to transcribe.

Structure
The Kojiki contains various songs and poems. While the historical records and myths are written in a form of Chinese with a heavy mixture of Japanese elements, the songs are written with Chinese characters, though only used phonetically. This special use of Chinese characters is called Man'yōgana, a knowledge of which is critical to understanding these songs, which are written in Old Japanese.

Sections

The Kamitsumaki also outlines the myths concerning the foundation of Japan. It describes how Ninigi-no-Mikoto, grandson of Amaterasu and great-grandfather of Emperor Jimmu, descended from heaven to Takachihonomine in Kyūshū and became the progenitor of the Japanese Imperial line.
The Nakatsumaki begins with the conquests of Jimmu, which make him the first Emperor of Japan; and ends with the 15th Emperor, Ōjin. The second through ninth Emperors' reigns are recorded in a minimum of detail, with only their names, the names of their various descendants, and the locations of their palaces and tombs listed, with no mention of their achievements. Many of the stories in this volume are mythological; the allegedly historical information is highly suspect.
The Shimotsumaki covers the 16th to 33rd Emperors and, unlike previous volumes, has very limited references to interactions with deities. (Such interactions are very prominent in the first and second volumes.) Information about the 24th to 33rd Emperors is scant.

Synopsis 
What follows is a condensed summary of the contents of the text, including many of the names of gods, emperors, and locations as well as events which took place in association with them. The original Japanese is included in parentheses where appropriate.

Preface 
Ō no Yasumaro's preface, in the form of a dedicatory address to Empress Genmei, begins with a poem summarizing the main contents of the work. He then relates how Emperor Tenmu commissioned Hieda no Are to memorize the genealogies and records of the imperial house years earlier, and how Genmei in turn ordered Yasumaro to compile a written record of what Are had learned. He finally concludes the preface with a brief explanation of the Chinese characters used to transcribe native Japanese words in the text and the division of the work into three volumes.

The Kamitsumaki, or first volume

The Nakatsumaki, or second volume 
Kamu-Yamato-Iwarebiko-no-Mikoto, or Emperor Jimmu
Emperor Jimmu conquers Yamato
The sword from heaven, or Futsu no mitama and the three legged crow, or Yatagarasu
The emperor's brother Hikoitsuse no Mikoto
From Kumano to Yamato
An ancient ballad, kumeuta
The Empress Isukeyorihime or Empress Hime Tatara Isuzu
The rebellion of Tagishimimi no Mikoto
Kamu-Nunakawamimi-no-Mikoto, or Emperor Suizei
Shikitsuhiko-Tamatemi-no-Mikoto, or Emperor Annei
Ōyamatohiko-Sukitomo-no-Mikoto, or Emperor Itoku
Mimatsuhiko-Kaeshine-no-Mikoto, or Emperor Kōshō
Ōyamato-Tarashihiko-Kuni-oshihito-no-Mikoto, or Emperor Kōan
Ōyamato-Nekohiko-Futoni-no-Mikoto, or Emperor Kōrei
Ōyamato-Nekohiko-Kunikuru-no-Mikoto, or Emperor Kōgen
Wakayamato-Nekohiko-Ōbibi-no-Mikoto, or Emperor Kaika
Mimakiirihiko-Inie-no-Mikoto, or Emperor Sujin
The emperor's son and queen
The god of Mount Miwa or Mimoro, Ōmononushi
The rebellion of Takehaniyasu no Miko
Emperor Hatsukunishirashishi
Ikume-Iribiko-Isachi-no-Mikoto, or Emperor Suinin
The emperor's son and queen
The Sahobiko and Sahobime
Homuchiwakenomiko
The fruit of time
Ōtarashihiko-Oshirowake-no-Sumeramikoto, or Emperor Keikō
The emperor's son and queen
Yamato-Takeru-no-Mikoto's conquest of the Kumaso people
Izumo-Takeru's Subjugation
Yamato Takeru's conquest of the eastern regions
Miyazuhime
The Kunishinobiuta, or country song
Yahiroshiro Chidori
Yamato-Takeru's Posterity
Wakatarashihiko-no-Sumeramikoto, or Emperor Seimu
Tarashi-Nakatsuhiko-no-Sumeramikoto, or Emperor Chūai
The emperor's son and queen
The divine possession of Price Jingū
The prince's expedition to Silla
Kagosaka no Miko and Oshikuma no Miko's rebellion
The great god Kehi
The Sakekura song
Homudawake-no-Mikoto, or Emperor Ōjin
The emperor's son and queen
Price Ōyamamori no Mikoto and Emperor Ōsazaki no Mikoto
Yakahaehime
Kaminagahime
The Kuzu song
The tribute of Baekje
The rebellion of Price Ōyamamori no Mikoto
Visit of Amenohiboko
Akiyama Shitahiotoko and Haruyama Kasumiotoko
The emperor's posterity

The Shimotsumaki, or final volume 
Ōsazaki no mikoto, or Emperor Nintoku
The emperor's son and queen
Kibi Kurohime
Yatanowakiiratsume and Iha no hime
Hayabusawake no kimi and Medori no kimi
Wild goose eggs
A boat called Kareno, or desolate field
Izahowake no miko, or Emperor Richū
The rebellion of Suminoenonakatsu no kimi
Mizuhawake no kimi and Sobakari
Mizuhawake no mikoto, or Emperor Hanzei
Osatsumawakugonosukune no miko, or Emperor Ingyō
The emperor's son and queen
Uji kabane system
Karunohitsugi no miko and Karunōhoiratsume
Anaho no miko, or Emperor Ankō
Ōkusaka no kimi and Nenōmi
The incident of Mayowa no kimi and Mayowa no ōkimi
Ichinobenōshiwa no kimi
Ōhatsusewakatake no mikoto, or Emperor Yūryaku
The emperor's son and queen
Wakakusakabe no kimi
Akaiko
Yoshinomiya
Kazuraki Hitokotonushi no ōkami
Odohime, Mie Uneme
Shiraka no ōyamato, or Emperor Seinei
Shijimu Nihimurōtage
Utagaki
Iwasuwake no mikoto, or Emperor Kenzō
Okeme Roujo
Misasagi no Tsuchi
Ōke no miko, or Emperor Ninken
Ohatsuse no wakasazaki no mikoto, or Emperor Buretsu
Ohodo no mikoto, or Emperor Keitai
Hirokunioshitakekanahi no miko, or Emperor Ankan
Takeohirokunioshitate no mikoto, or Emperor Senka
Amekunioshiharukihironiwa no sumeramiko, or Emperor Kinmei
Nunakurafutotamashiki no mikoto, or Emperor Bidatsu
Tachibananotoyohi no miko, or Emperor Yōmei
Hatsusebenowakasazaki no sumeramikoto, or Emperor Sushun
Toyomikekashikiyahime no mikoto, or Empress Suiko

English-language translations 
Chamberlain, Basil Hall. 1882. A translation of the "Ko-ji-ki" or Records of ancient matters. Yokohama, Japan: R. Meiklejohn and Co., Printers. (www.sacred-texts.com)
Philippi, Donald L. 1968/1969. Kojiki. Princeton, New Jersey: Princeton University Press and Tokyo: University of Tokyo Press.
 Heldt, Gustav. 2014. The Kojiki: An Account of Ancient Matters. New York: Columbia University Press.

See also
 
 Atsuta Shrine
 Historiography of Japan
 Japanese Historical Text Initiative
 Kokki
 Kujiki
 Kyūji
 Mahoroba
 Nihon Shoki
 Philosophy of history
 Teiki
 Tennōki
 The White Hare of Inaba

Notes

References

 Bentley, John R. The Authenticity of Sendai Kuji Hongi: A New Examination of Texts, With a Translation And Commentary.
 Brownlee, John S. (1997) Japanese historians and the national myths, 1600-1945: The Age of the Gods and Emperor Jimmu. Vancouver: University of British Columbia Press.  Tokyo: University of Tokyo Press.
 Brownlee, John S. (1991). Political Thought in Japanese Historical Writing: From Kojiki (712) to Tokushi Yoron (1712). Waterloo, Ontario: Wilfrid Laurier University Press.
 
 Ono, Motonori Shinto: The Kami Way
 Starrs, Roy (2005). "The Kojiki as Japan's National Narrative", in Asian Futures, Asian Traditions, edited by Edwina Palmer. Folkestone, Kent: Global Oriental, 
Wittkamp, Robert F. (2018). "The Body as a Mode of Conceptualization in the Kojiki Cosmogony" in「東西学術研究所紀要」第51輯 (Tōzai gakujutsu kenkyūsho kiyō 51, pp. 47–64, PDF online available). 
Wittkamp, Robert F. (2020): "Re-Examining Japanese Mythologies: Why the Nihon Shoki has two books of myths but the Kojiki only one" in「東西学術研究所紀要」第53輯 (Tōzai gakujutsu kenkyūsho kiyō 53, pp. 13–39, PDF online available).

External links

 Original Text of the Kojiki.
  Chamberlain's translation of Kojiki:
 full text at the Internet Sacred Text Archive
 scan from The sacred books and early literature of the East, edited by Charles Horne
  Encyclopedia of Shinto　Kokugakuin University
  Basic Terms of Shinto　Kokugakuin University
  Online original text of the Kojiki and other texts
  Waseda University Library: 1644 manuscript, three volumes

 
Old Japanese texts
8th-century history books
History books about Japan
Nara-period works
8th century in Japan
Japanese mythology
Shinto texts
8th-century works
East Asian religious texts
Asuka period
Japanese literature in Classical Chinese
711
712